Villemeneux is a hamlet located on the territory of the commune of Brie-Comte-Robert, in Seine-et-Marne, France.

Localization
Villemeneux is located at the medium of the agricultural fields, very close to Combs-la-Ville and the town of Brie-Comte-Robert.

Here is a warehouse of buses, which serve these nearby cities.

Construction
The town of increasing Brie-Comte-Robert and the trade increase in a number.

Consequently the population of Villemeneux increases and there are more and more houses in construction and of restoration of old farms and barns.

Agriculture
Villemeneux is surrounded of fields of Colza...; There are still farms and the main thing activity of the locality is agriculture.

References

Brie-Comte-Robert